TBK may refer to:

The Black Keys
"The" Brian Kendrick
The Brothers Karamazov
TANK-binding kinase 1
Teargarden by Kaleidyscope
The Big Kahuna (film)
 Funnelbeaker culture or TBK (German: Trichter(-rand-)becherkultur), an archaeological culture in north-central Europe.

Tbk may stand for
terbuka ("open"), a suffix for Indonesian companies indicating a publicly traded company at the Jakarta Stock Exchange